Radkov may refer to places in the Czech Republic:

Radkov (Jihlava District)
Radkov (Opava District)
Radkov (Svitavy District)
Radkov (Tábor District)
Radkov (Žďár nad Sázavou District)

See also
Radkov (surname)